Ercole Gaibara ( – 1690) was an Italian Baroque composer, music teacher, and violinist.

Biographie 
Ercole Gaibara was active in Bologna during the first half of the 17th century. There is very little information about his life except that he was a very renowned violinist, earning the nickname "del Violino" by his students. He succeeded Alfonso Pagani as the violinist of Concerto Palatino.

The musicologist Marc Pincherle considers him the founder of the École Bolonaise de violon (Bolognese School of Violin) where he taught Arcangelo Corelli, Giuseppe Torelli,  and Leonardo Brugnoli, he may have also taught Alessandro Stradella.

References

Bibliography 
 Bolognese Instrumental Music, 1660-1710, Gregory Richard Barnett, Ashgate Publishing, 2008

17th-century Italian composers